Yucca is a genus of perennial shrubs and trees in the family Asparagaceae, subfamily Agavoideae. Its 40–50 species are notable for their rosettes of evergreen, tough, sword-shaped leaves and large terminal panicles of white or whitish flowers. They are native to the hot and dry (arid) parts of the Americas and the Caribbean.

Early reports of the species were confused with the cassava (Manihot esculenta). Consequently, Linnaeus mistakenly derived the generic name from the Taíno word for the latter, yuca. The Aztecs living in Mexico since before the Spanish arrival, in Nahuatl, call the local yucca species (Yucca gigantea) , which gave the Spanish .  is also used for Yucca filifera.

Distribution

The natural distribution range of the genus Yucca (49 species and 24 subspecies) covers a vast area of the Americas. The genus is represented throughout Mexico and extends into Guatemala (Yucca guatemalensis). It also extends to the north through Baja California in the west, northwards into the southwestern United States, through the drier central states as far north as southern Alberta in Canada (Yucca glauca ssp. albertana).

Yucca is also native northward to the coastal lowlands and dry beach scrub of the coastal areas of the southeastern United States, along the Gulf of Mexico and South Atlantic States from coastal Texas to Maryland.

Yuccas have adapted to an equally vast range of climatic and ecological conditions. They are to be found in rocky deserts and badlands, in prairies and grassland, in mountainous regions, in light woodland, in coastal sands (Yucca filamentosa), and even in subtropical and semitemperate zones, although these are generally arid to semi-arid.

Ecology
Yuccas have a very specialized, mutualistic pollination system; being pollinated by yucca moths (family Prodoxidae); the insect transfers the pollen from the stamens of one plant to the stigma of another, and at the same time lays an egg in the flower; the moth larva then feeds on some of the developing seeds, always leaving enough seed to perpetuate the species. Certain species of the yucca moth have evolved antagonistic features against the plant. They do not assist in the plant's pollination efforts while continuing to lay their eggs in the plant for protection.

Yucca species are the host plants for the caterpillars of the yucca giant-skipper (Megathymus yuccae), ursine giant-skipper (Megathymus ursus), and Strecker's giant-skipper (Megathymus streckeri).

 Beetle herbivores include yucca weevils, in the Curculionidae.

Uses
Yuccas are widely grown as ornamental plants in gardens. Many species also bear edible parts, including fruits, seeds, flowers, flowering stems, and more rarely roots. References to yucca root as food often arise from confusion with the similarly pronounced, but botanically unrelated, yuca, also called cassava or manioc (Manihot esculenta). Roots of soaptree yucca (Yucca elata) are high in saponins and are used as a shampoo in Native American rituals. Dried yucca leaves and trunk fibers have a low ignition temperature, making the plant desirable for use in starting fires via friction. The stem (when dried) that sports the flowers is often used in collaboration with a sturdy piece of cedar for fire-making.
In rural Appalachian areas, species such as Yucca filamentosa are referred to as "meat hangers." With their sharp-spined tips, the tough, fibrous leaves were used to puncture meat and knotted to form a loop with which to hang meat for salt curing or in smokehouses. The fibers can be used to make cordage, be it sewing thread or rope.

Yucca extract is also used as a foaming agent in some beverages such as root beer and soda.

Gastronomy
The flower petals are commonly eaten in Central America, but its reproductive organs (the anthers and ovaries) are first removed because of their bitterness. The petals are blanched for 5 minutes, and then cooked a la mexicana (with tomato, onion, chili) or in tortitas con salsa (egg-battered patties with green or red sauce). In Guatemala, they are boiled and eaten with lemon juice.

In El Salvador, the tender tips of stems are eaten and known locally as cogollo de izote.

Cultivation
The most common houseplant yucca is Yucca gigantea.

Yuccas are widely grown as architectural plants providing a dramatic accent to landscape design. They tolerate a range of conditions but are best grown in full sun in subtropical or mild temperate areas. In gardening centres and horticultural catalogues, they are usually grouped with other architectural plants such as cordylines and phormiums.

Several species of yucca can be grown outdoors in temperate climates, including:-

 Yucca filamentosa
 Yucca flaccida
 Yucca glauca
 Yucca gloriosa 
 Yucca recurvifolia
 Yucca rostrata

Symbolism
The yucca flower is the state flower of New Mexico in the southwest United States. No species name is given in the citation; however, the New Mexico Centennial Blue Book from 2012 references the soaptree yucca (Yucca elata) as one of the more widespread species in New Mexico.

Species 
, the World Checklist of Selected Plant Families recognizes 49 species of Yucca and several hybrids:

A number of other species previously classified in Yucca are now classified in the genera Dasylirion, Furcraea, Hesperaloe, Hesperoyucca, and Nolina.

Cultivars
From 1897 to 1907, Carl Ludwig Sprenger created and named 122 Yucca hybrids.

Gallery

Notes

References

General
 Fritz Hochstätter (Hrsg.):  Yucca (Agavaceae). Band 1 Dehiscent-fruited species in the Southwest and Midwest of the USA, Canada, and Baja California , Selbst Verlag, 2000. 
 Fritz Hochstätter (Hrsg.):  Yucca (Agavaceae). Band 2 Indehiscent-fruited species in the Southwest, Midwest, and East of the USA, Selbst Verlag. 2002. 
 Fritz Hochstätter (Hrsg.):  Yucca (Agavaceae). Band 3 Mexico , Selbst Verlag, 2004.

External links 

 
 Yucca species and their Common names - Fritz Hochstätter
 New Mexico Statutes and Court Rules: State Flower 
 

 
Agavoideae
Asparagaceae genera
North American desert flora
Taxa named by Carl Linnaeus
Saponaceous plants
Vegetable fibers
Fiber plants